This is a list of episodes from the American sitcom My Three Sons. The show was broadcast on ABC from 1960 to 1965, and was then switched over to CBS until the end of its run; 380 half-hour episodes were filmed.  184 black-and-white episodes were produced for ABC from 1960 to 1965, for the first five years of its run.
When the show moved to CBS in September 1965, it switched to color, and 196 half-hour color episodes were produced for telecast from September 1965 to the series' end in 1972.

Series overview

Episodes

Season 1 (1960–61)

Season 2 (1961–62)

Season 3 (1962–63)

Season 4 (1963–64)

Season 5 (1964–65)

Season 6 (1965–66)  
Episodes now airing on CBS & filmed in color

Season 7 (1966–67)

Season 8 (1967–68)

Season 9 (1968–69)

Season 10 (1969–70)

Season 11 (1970–71)

Season 12 (1971–72)

Special (1977)

References

External links
 
 My Three Sons
 TV Special: A Thanksgiving Reunion with The Partridge Family and My Three Sons

Lists of American sitcom episodes
Lists of American comedy-drama television series episodes